Romanza is a 1991 music album by Andrea Bocelli, and its title track.

Romanza (Italian and Spanish, 'Romance') may also refer to:

 Romance (music), a traditional music term, including a list of compositions entitled "Romance" or "Romanza"
 Romanza (Sephardic music)
Romanza, a 2011 album by Jim Brickman
Romanza, a 2005 album by Liona Boyd

See also

 Romansa (disambiguation)
 Romance (disambiguation)
 Romanza final, a 1986 biographic film about opera singer Julián Gayarre